Metaceratodus is an extinct genus of prehistoric lungfish in the family Ceratodontidae, with an indeterminate specimen known from the Late Triassic (Norian)-aged Lissauer Breccia of Poland and more complete specimens known from the Late Cretaceous of Queensland, Australia and Argentina (Malargue Group). The genus was named and described by Frederick Chapman in 1914.

Species 
The seven identified species of Metaceratodus are listed below, while an eighth unnamed species is known from Poland:

 cf. Metaceratodus sp.
 Metaceratodus baibianorum
 Metaceratodus bonei
 Metaceratodus ellioti
 Metaceratodus kaopen (=Ptychoceratodus kaopen, P. cionei)
 Metaceratodus palmeri
 Metaceratodus wichmanni (=Ceratodus wichmanni)
 Metaceratodus wollastoni

See also

 Sarcopterygii
 List of sarcopterygians
 List of prehistoric bony fish

References

Prehistoric lobe-finned fish genera
Prehistoric fish of Australia
Fauna of Queensland
Norian first appearances
Fossil taxa described in 1914